Ahmed Gebrel (born January 22, 1991) is a former Olympic swimmer who was born in Cairo (Egypt) for a Palestinian father and Egyptian mother. He started swimming in Al-Ahly Sporting Club in Egypt at young age (4 years). At that time he used to hold only the Palestinian nationality so at age 15 he could represent his country Palestine in 2006. He hold the Palestinian Swimming Records in: 100m, 200m, 400m, 800m and 1500m Freestyle, as well as the 200m and 400m Individual Medley.

Ahmed is the first and the only Palestinian swimmer to competes twice in the Olympic Games; he participated at the London 2012 and Rio 2016 Olympic Games. He won many titles and various awards during his career representing Al-Ahly Sporting club in Egypt, Club Natacion Piera and Club Natacion Barcelona in Spain, and in international competitions representing Palestine. Moreover, he competed in four World FINA Championships in Rome 2009, Shanghai 2011, Barcelona 2013 & Kazan 2015.

He retired in 2016 and started his career as a swimming coach to share the passion he has for swimming with everyone. He lives in United Arab Emirates since 2016, he became a competition Squads program manager in one of the well known sports centers in Dubai besides that he works for Abu Dhabi Sports Channel as a commentator.

Olympic career
He represented Palestine at the 2012 Summer Olympics, he competed in the Men's 400 metre freestyle, finishing in 27th place in the heats.  He finished 3rd in his heat, however, he managed to break his own personal best by 9.89 seconds. With no competition-sized pool being available in Palestine, he prepared for the Olympic Games in Barcelona for a period of 4 months. After his achievement in London 2012, he received an Olympic scholarship in Barcelona to continue his professional career as an international swimmer.

Ahmed made history by representing Palestine in the 2016 Summer Olympics in Rio de Janeiro, as he was the first and so far only Palestinian swimmer to compete twice at the Olympic Games. He completed in the Men's 200 metre freestyle, finishing in the 47th place in the heats.

References

External links
 

1991 births
Living people
Palestinian male freestyle swimmers
Olympic swimmers of Palestine
Swimmers at the 2012 Summer Olympics
Swimmers at the 2016 Summer Olympics